The Sabun is a river in the Khanty-Mansi Autonomous Okrug in Russia. It is a right-hand tributary of the westward-flowing Vakh, which it enters from the north.

Environment

The interfluvial area between the Kolikyogan and Sabun of the west Siberian lowland is a zone of raised string bogs covering . It is a status B Ramsar wetland, nominated for designation as a Wetland of International Importance in 2000. Martens are found throughout the Sabun valley, as well as sables and kidas, crosses between sables and martens.

History

In the early 1940s the inhabitants of the upper reaches of the Tolka,  to the north, were resettled by the Soviet authorities in the Sabun basin after their shamans had been arrested and executed.
They brought their reindeer with them, but the reindeer could not adapt and many died. The people of the community were unable to find food in the new environment, and some starved. They were allowed to return to the Tolka after the war.

References

Sources

Rivers of Khanty-Mansi Autonomous Okrug